At 4:30pm on 22 March 2018, a car bomb exploded outside Wehliye hotel on Maka Al-Mukarrama Road in Mogadishu, Somalia, killing 18 people. Al-Shabaab claimed responsibility for the bombing, saying that they targeted a meeting of government and security officials.

References
  

2010s in Mogadishu
2018 in Somalia
2010s crimes in Mogadishu
Terrorist incidents in Somalia in 2018
Explosions in Mogadishu